The  Ministry of Housing and Communal Services  is an agency of the government of Bashkortostan, headquartered with State Committee for of Housing and Building Oversight in 28 Khalturin street, Ufa.

Ministers 
After the 2019 Head of the Ministry has been Boris Belyaev.

See also
Office of Federal Housing Enterprise Oversight
State Committee for of Housing and Building Oversight

References

External links
 Official Website in Russian

Politics of Bashkortostan
Government ministries of Bashkortostan
Bashkortostan